Anthony Steven "Tony" Philp MF is a former Windsurfing World Champion and Olympic sailor from Fiji. Currently a Brand Ambassador for international outdoor magazine The Outdoor Journal, he is also a consultant for the International Surfing Association – and worked with them on the ISA World Stand Up Paddle and Paddleboard Championship in Fiji in November 2016.

Philp is one of only two Fiji-born athletes, along with golfer Vijay Singh, to be ranked number one in their sports official world ranking list.
  
Throughout his sporting career Philp won 13 individual Windsurfer World titles at the 1991, 1992, 1993, 1994, 1995 World Championships (including 4 overall world titles) and competed at 5 consecutive Olympic Games from 1984 to 2000. He was also vice–world champion in both the Windsurfer and Mistral Olympic Class in 1989 and 1999 and topped the ISAF (International Sailing Association Federation) world-ranking list for Olympic windsurfing in 1997.

At age 15, Philp was the youngest ever athlete to compete at an Olympic sailing event (Los Angeles 1984), and was a flag bearer for his country at the 2000 Olympic Games. He was made a Member of the Order of Fiji, the most senior award in the Fijian honors system in 1995 and was inducted into the Fiji Sports Hall of Fame in 2009, for achievements and contribution towards sports in Fiji.

Selected achievements

See also
Windsurfing World Championships
List of World Championships medalists in sailing (windsurfer classes)

References

External links

Fijian windsurfers
Living people
1969 births
Olympic sailors of Fiji
Fijian male sailors (sport)
Sailors at the 1984 Summer Olympics – Windglider
Sailors at the 1988 Summer Olympics – Division II
Sailors at the 1992 Summer Olympics – Lechner A-390
Sailors at the 1996 Summer Olympics – Mistral One Design
Sailors at the 2000 Summer Olympics – Mistral One Design
Sportspeople from Suva
Fijian people of British descent
Fijian people of I-Taukei Fijian descent